Mekhti Ramazanovich Dzhenetov (born 26 January 1992) is a professional football player who plays for Zira FK in the Azerbaijan Premier League. Born in Russia, he represents the Azerbaijan national team.

Career

Club
Dzhenetov made his professional debut in the Russian Professional Football League for FC Anzhi-2 Makhachkala on 12 August 2014 in a game against FC Alania Vladikavkaz.

He made his Russian Football National League debut for FC Anzhi Makhachkala on 30 May 2015 in a game against FC Sakhalin Yuzhno-Sakhalinsk.

On 26 May 2021, Zira announced the signing of Dzhenetov on a two-year contract.

International
He was first called up to the Azerbaijan national football team in October 2019 for a friendly against Bahrain. He made his debut on 6 June 2021 in a friendly against Moldova.

Career statistics

Club

International

References

External links
 
 
 

1992 births
Living people
Footballers from Makhachkala
Citizens of Azerbaijan through descent
Azerbaijani footballers
Azerbaijan international footballers
Russian footballers
Russian sportspeople of Azerbaijani descent
Association football goalkeepers
FC Anzhi Makhachkala players
FC Baltika Kaliningrad players
Russian First League players
Russian Second League players
Azerbaijan Premier League players
Sumgayit FK players